Taivala is a monotypic genus of  jumping spiders containing the single species, Taivala invisitata. It was first described by G. Peckham & Elizabeth Peckham in 1907, and is found in Sarawak, Borneo. Only females have been found, but it is thought to be closely related to Pseudamycus. A female epigyne was drawn by Proszynski in 1984.

References

External links
 Diagnostic drawings of T. invisitata

Further reading

Monotypic Salticidae genera
Salticidae
Spiders of Asia